Chryseobacterium soli is a bacterium. It is aerobic, Gram-negative, non-motile, yellow-pigmented and straight rod-shaped. Its type strain is JS6-6(T) (=KACC 12502(T)=DSM 19298(T)).

References

Further reading

Whitman, William B., et al., eds. Bergey's manual® of systematic bacteriology. Vol. 4 and 5. Springer, 2012.
Van Wyk, Esias Renier. Virulence Factors and Other Clinically Relevant Characteristics of Chryseobacterium Species. Diss. University of the Freee State, 2008.

External links 
LPSN

Type strain of Chryseobacterium soli at BacDive -  the Bacterial Diversity Metadatabase

soli
Bacteria described in 2008